Zaledeyevo is a rural locality (a village) in Nesterovskoye Rural Settlement, Sokolsky District, Vologda Oblast, Russia. The population was 12 as of 2002.

Geography 
Zaledeyevo is located 45 km north of Sokol (the district's administrative centre) by road. Istominskoye is the nearest rural locality.

References 

Rural localities in Sokolsky District, Vologda Oblast